Opus spicatum, literally "spiked work," is a type of masonry construction used in Roman and medieval times. It consists of bricks, tiles or cut stone laid in a herringbone pattern.

Uses
Its usage was generally decorative and most commonly it served as a pavement, though it was also used as an infill pattern in walls, as in the striking base of the causeway leading up to the gate tower at Tamworth Castle. Unless the elements run horizontally and vertically, it is inherently weak, since the oblique angles of the elements tend to spread the pattern horizontally under compression.

Firebacks 

Herringbone work, particularly in stone, is also used to make firebacks in stone hearths. Acidic flue gases tend to corrode lime mortar, so a finely-set herringbone could remain intact with a minimum of mortar used. Usk Castle has several fine examples. 
The herringbone pattern produces opposing shear plane faces, increasing the relative surface area and therefore rendering it a more sound design for mortar and brick.

Examples
The herringbone method was used by Filippo Brunelleschi in constructing the dome of the Cathedral of Florence (Santa Maria del Fiore).

Herringbone brickwork was also a feature of Gothic Revival architecture.

See also

References

Opus caementicium roman walls

Bricks
Building stone
Pavements
Architectural elements
Roman construction techniques